The Men's slalom competition of the Sapporo 1972 Olympics was held at Teine.

The defending world champion was Jean-Noel Augert of France, who was also the defending World Cup slalom champion and the leader of the 1972 World Cup.

Results

Final
Sunday, February 13, 1972

Classification
Saturday, February 12, 1972The classification round determined the starting order in the final.

Group 1

Group 2

Group 3

Group 4

Group 5

References

External links
 YouTube.com - 1972 Winter Olympics - Men's Slalom - Gold medalist's second run - from Japanese television

Men's slalom
Winter Olympics
Men's slalom